Dapuqiao is a station on Line 9 of the Shanghai Metro. The station came into operation on December 31, 2009. It is located beneath the Xuhui Sun Moon Light Center.

External links

Railway stations in Shanghai
Railway stations in China opened in 2009
Shanghai Metro stations in Huangpu District
Line 9, Shanghai Metro